Bangladesh Forest Industries Development Corporation or BFIDC, is an autonomous government body that manages the commercial exploitation of forests in Bangladesh, produce timber and  wood products and manage plantations and is located in Motijheel Thana, Dhaka, Bangladesh.

History
The corporation traces its origin to East Pakistan Forest Industries Development Corporation which was formed on 1959 and was changed to Bangladesh Forest Industries Development Corporation established on 1972 through a presidential ordinance. In 2016 it started manufacturing and selling furniture made from wood from rubber trees. It grows and s rubber plantations in Bangladesh.

References

1972 establishments in Bangladesh
Government-owned companies of Bangladesh
Organisations based in Dhaka
Organisations based in Motijheel
Forestry in Bangladesh